Igreja da Exaltação de Santa Cruz is a church in Batalha, Portugal. It is classified as a National Monument.

Churches in Leiria District
National monuments in Leiria District